Hyperchloremic acidosis is a form of metabolic acidosis associated with a normal anion gap, a decrease in plasma bicarbonate concentration, and an increase in plasma chloride concentration (see anion gap for a fuller explanation). Although plasma anion gap is normal, this condition is often associated with an increased urine anion gap, due to the kidney's inability to secrete ammonia.

Causes
In general, the cause of a hyperchloremic metabolic acidosis is a loss of base, either a gastrointestinal loss or a renal loss. 

Gastrointestinal loss of bicarbonate 
 Severe diarrhea (vomiting will tend to cause hypochloraemic alkalosis)
 Pancreatic fistula with loss of bicarbonate rich pancreatic fluid
  Nasojejunal tube losses in the context of small bowel obstruction and loss of alkaline proximal small bowel secretions
 Chronic laxative abuse
Renal causes
 Proximal renal tubular acidosis with failure of  resorption 
 Distal renal tubular acidosis with failure of  secretion
 Long-term use of a carbonic anhydrase inhibitor such as acetazolamide
Other causes
 Ingestion of ammonium chloride, hydrochloric acid, or other acidifying salts
 The treatment and recovery phases of diabetic ketoacidosis 
 Volume resuscitation with 0.9% normal saline provides a chloride load, so that infusing more than 3-4L can cause acidosis
 Hyperalimentation (i.e., total parenteral nutrition)

See also
Anion gap
Metabolic acidosis
Pseudohypoaldosteronism

References

Further reading

External links 

 
 NIH - Renal Tubular Acidosis

Acid–base disturbances
Electrolyte disturbances